75 Public Square is a high-rise office building on Public Square in downtown Cleveland, Ohio. It was designed by the Cleveland architectural firm of Hubbell & Benes and was completed in 1915. It served as the headquarters for the Cleveland Electric Illuminating Company until the construction of the adjacent 55 Public Square in 1958. The building also abuts Cleveland's historic Old Stone Church. In 2014, the Millennia Companies, planning to convert the building into apartments, purchased the building for $4 million.

References

Skyscraper office buildings in Cleveland
FirstEnergy
Office buildings completed in 1915